The 2018–19 Boston Bruins season was the 95th season for the National Hockey League franchise that was established on November 1, 1924. The Bruins clinched a playoff spot on March 23, 2019, after a 7–3 win over the Florida Panthers.

On May 16, 2019, the Bruins advanced to the 2019 Stanley Cup Finals with a 4–0 victory over the Carolina Hurricanes, marking their first Stanley Cup Finals appearance since 2013. They would lose in seven games to the St. Louis Blues.

Standings

Schedule and results

Preseason
The preseason schedule was published on May 18, 2018.

Regular season
The regular season schedule was released on June 21, 2018.

Playoffs

The Bruins faced the Toronto Maple Leafs in the First Round of the playoffs, and defeated them in seven games. They played against each other in the 2018 Stanley Cup playoffs, where the Bruins defeated the Maple Leafs in the First Round in seven games.

The Bruins faced the Columbus Blue Jackets in the Second Round of the playoffs, defeating them in six games.

The Bruins faced the Carolina Hurricanes in the Conference Finals, and swept the series in four games. They played against each other in the 2009 Stanley Cup playoffs, where the Bruins lost to the Hurricanes in the Conference Semifinals in seven games.

The Bruins faced the St. Louis Blues in the Stanley Cup Finals, where the Bruins lost to the Blues in seven games. This marked the first time since 1990 that they had home ice advantage in the final round.

Player statistics
As of June 12, 2019

Skaters

Goaltenders

†Denotes player spent time with another team before joining the Bruins. Stats reflect time with the Bruins only.
‡Denotes player was traded mid-season. Stats reflect time with the Bruins only.
Bold/italics denotes franchise record.

Transactions
The Bruins have been involved in the following transactions during the 2018–19 season.

Trades

Free agents

Waivers

Contract terminations

Retirement

Signings

Draft picks

Below are the Boston Bruins' selections at the 2018 NHL Entry Draft, which was held on June 22 and 23, 2018, at the American Airlines Center in Dallas, Texas.

Notes:
 The Florida Panthers' third-round pick went to the Boston Bruins as the result of a trade on February 22, 2018, that sent Frank Vatrano to Florida in exchange for this pick.

References

Boston Bruins seasons
Boston Bruins
Boston Bruins
Boston Bruins
Boston Bruins
Eastern Conference (NHL) championship seasons
Boston Bruins
Bruins
Bruins